The Gate, Fence and Hollow Tree Shelter Designed by Dionicio Rodriguez is a work by noted artist Dionicio Rodriguez that is located at 320 Oak St. in Clayton, New Mexico.  It consists of three faux bois sculptures created in 1943. Speculator Bayliss C. Froman commissioned the sculptures on his property after seeing Rodriguez's work on a visit to San Antonio. The sculptures include a gate resembling the entrance to the San Antonio Japanese Tea Garden, an intertwining log fence, and a hollow tree with textured bark.

See also

National Register of Historic Places listings in Union County, New Mexico

References

External links 

Waymarking photo

Buildings and structures on the National Register of Historic Places in New Mexico
1943 sculptures
Buildings and structures in Union County, New Mexico
Outdoor sculptures in New Mexico
Concrete sculptures in the United States
1943 establishments in New Mexico
National Register of Historic Places in Union County, New Mexico